The Ministry of the Union Government Office (MUGO) was a ministry-level body that served the Union Government of Myanmar between 2017 and 2021. Since August 2021, the ministry has been split into two: the Ministry of the Union Government 1 (MUGO 1), and the Ministry of the Union Government 2 (MUGO 2).

History 
The original MUGO was created in November 2017. Its original charter was to discharge the responsibilities of the office of the President and the Union Government.

On 28 December 2018, General Administration Department (GAD) was reorganized and reinvoked under the Ministry of the Office of the Union Government after being detached from the Ministry of Home Affairs. On 5 May 2021, the SAC reorganized the GAD under Ministry of Home Affairs.

On 1 August 2021, the State Administration Council split the MUGO into two ministries: the Ministry of Union Government Office 1 and the Ministry of Union Government Office 2.

List of Union Ministers

deputy 
 Tin Myint (2 January 2019 - 1 February 2021)
 Major General Soe Tint Naing (2 February 2021 - 11 May 2021)

References 

UnionGovernmentOffice
Ministries established in 2017
2017 establishments in Myanmar